François Alexandre Émile Billard (5 April 1852 – 29 June 1930) was a French sailor who competed in the 1900 Summer Olympics in Paris, France.  took the gold in the 10 to 20 ton.

References

External links

 

1852 births
1930 deaths
French male sailors (sport)
Sailors at the 1900 Summer Olympics – 10 to 20 ton
Olympic sailors of France
Sportspeople from Le Havre
Olympic gold medalists for France
Olympic medalists in sailing
Medalists at the 1900 Summer Olympics